Taylor Matthew Bennett (born January 19, 1996) is an American rapper. He released an album titled Broad Shoulders featuring artists such as Donnie Trumpet, King Louie, and his older brother Chance the Rapper. He is from the West Chatham neighborhood of  Chicago.

Early life
Taylor Bennett's father, Donald J Williams-Bennett, worked for the Mayor of Chicago and his mother Lisa Bennett formerly worked for the attorney general. His father ensured that he would pursue his dreams while also making it through school. He attended Urban Prep High School. He and his brother demonstrated an interest in the arts very early, rapping with each other and building their skills.

In 2014, Bennett and others were charged with assault and battery for allegedly severely injuring a teenage Columbia College Chicago student at a party. They beat the victim badly after he stepped on Bennett's shoe.

Music career
Much like his brother, Bennett has developed a unique sound and style of rapping. Some artists that have influenced his growth as a musician include Twista, Nas, and Kendrick Lamar who has had a noticeable impact on his music. He claims that Kanye West's College Dropout had a significant role in his ability to see the fun-loving side of music.

Bennett's brother preferred that he build his own fanbase before he began working with and promoting him. Chance believed this was an important step in his development as an artist. Bennett finally started selling out shows at local venues such as Reggie's and even opened for his idol Nas at a Lollapalooza after party in 2014. Following his success, he and his brother released a track "Broad Shoulders", which is also the title track of one of his most recent mixtapes.

In 2015, Bennett released the mixtape "Broad Shoulders". It features artists such as Logan Parks, Talia Stewart, and Jordan Bratton, most of whom are native Chicagoans. This was also his first full album without any elements sampled from preexisting songs. In July 2018, Bennett released a single titled "Rock n Roll" along with the video from his upcoming EP, "Be Yourself".

Personal life
On January 18, 2017, Bennett came out as bisexual on his Twitter account before his 21st birthday.

Legal issues 
On October 17, 2014, an article was released from dnainfo reported that Bennett was involved in an altercation at a house party in his native city of Chicago that left his victim with major head trauma. The article states that Bennett and his friend attacked the victim after the victim stepped on Bennett's shoes. The incident was captured on video by attendees at the party, who would identify Bennett on social media. Bennett would turn himself in and be released on a $75,000 bond.

Discography

Albums

Mixtapes

Extended plays

Singles

As featured artist

References

African-American rappers
LGBT African Americans
LGBT people from Illinois
Rappers from Chicago
Bisexual men
Bisexual singers
LGBT rappers
American LGBT singers
American LGBT songwriters
Bisexual songwriters
1996 births
Living people
21st-century American rappers
20th-century American LGBT people
21st-century American LGBT people
21st-century African-American musicians
American bisexual writers